Thornwood is an unincorporated community in Skagit County, in the U.S. state of Washington.

History
A post office called Thornwood was established in 1900, and remained in operation until 1912. The community derives its name from W. J. Thorne, an early resident.

References

Unincorporated communities in Skagit County, Washington
Unincorporated communities in Washington (state)